The 1931 DePaul Blue Demons football team was an American football team that represented DePaul University as an independent during the 1931 college football season. In its seventh and final season under head coach Eddie Anderson, the team compiled a 6–3 record and outscored opponents by a total of 176 to 121. 

Anderson went on to coach at Holy Cross and Iowa and was inducted into the College Football Hall of Fame in 1971.

Schedule

References

DePaul
DePaul Blue Demons football seasons
DePaul Blue Demons football